Mathis Christophe Picouleau (born 8 May 2000) is a French professional footballer who plays as a midfielder for French Ligue 2 club Valenciennes FC.

Career
On 7 June 2020, Picouleau signed this first professional contract with Valenciennes FC. Picouleau made his professional debut with Valenciennes in a 1-0 Ligue 2 loss to Paris FC on 29 August 2020.

References

External links

2000 births
Living people
Footballers from Rennes
French footballers
France youth international footballers
Association football midfielders
Valenciennes FC players
Ligue 2 players
Championnat National 2 players
Championnat National 3 players